Princess Vittoria Alliata di Villafranca (born 23 January 1950) is an Italian author, translator and aristocrat. As a teenager, she produced the first translation of J. R. R. Tolkien's The Lord of the Rings into Italian. She later wrested control of the family's 100-room summer palace from Opus Dei and the Mafia, and had it renovated.

Life and work

Vittoria Alliata di Villafranca was born in Geneva, Switzerland, on 23 January 1950.

As a teenager, Vittoria Alliata translated J. R. R. Tolkien's The Lord of the Rings into Italian as Il Signore degli Anelli, and the first volume of the trilogy, The Fellowship of the Ring, was published by Astrolabio in 1967. The two other volumes followed, and all were later published by Rusconi, and then Bompiani in 1970 after extensive revisions by Quirino Principe.

Vittoria Alliata did post-graduate studies in Lebanon in the late 1960s, but abandoned them in order to become acquainted with Arab and Muslim women of all social backgrounds. She travelled in the Middle East, including the Arabian Peninsula and Iran, for more than a decade, and her experiences resulted in the 1980 book Harem, which depicts the daily lives of Arab and Muslim women.

She spent 20 years dealing with the local mafia and restoring its 100 rooms. Her aunt had died in 1988, leaving half of the ownership of the Villa Valguarnera to Opus Dei. The will was contested by the family, but while in probate, the mafia sequestered the building, installed a guardian, and were rumoured to have plans to open a casino. The building is now owned by Alliata.

As of 2017, the entire second floor of the Villa Valguarnera was available to rent including the services of a housekeeper and a cook.

In 2019, The Times reported that Vittoria Alliata was "at war" over a new Tolkien translation into Italian, and that her translation is "beloved of the far right".

Vittoria Alliata spoke at a conference in Moscow of the International Movement of Russophiles in March 2023, during the Russian invasion of Ukraine.

Selected publications 

 InDigest, il meglio dell'America per un mondo migliore, Edizioni La Pietra, 1975
 Harem, memorie d'Arabia di una nobildonna siciliana, Garzanti, 1980
 Baraka, dal Tamigi alle Piramidi, Mondadori, 1984
 Rajah, in Malesia alla ricerca dell'incenso perduto tra sultani, maghe e poeti, Garzanti, 1987

References

Further reading

 

1950 births
Living people
Italian nobility
Italian princesses
Italian translators
Italian non-fiction writers
Sicilian nobility
Sicilian princesses